Jane Perry may refer to:

 Jane Perry (Shortland Street), a character on Shortland Street
 Jane Perry (actress), Canadian actress and voice actor